Zion Lutheran Church is a historic church at 501–503 Columbus Avenue in Sandusky, Ohio.

It served a German-language congregation originally formed in 1847, and held a German language service into the 1940s.

The building is a one-story limestone building built in 1898. It was added to the National Register of Historic Places in 1982.

References

Lutheran churches in Ohio
Churches on the National Register of Historic Places in Ohio
Romanesque Revival church buildings in Ohio
Churches completed in 1898
Churches in Erie County, Ohio
National Register of Historic Places in Erie County, Ohio
Churches in Sandusky, Ohio
1898 establishments in Ohio